Cardiorhinus elegans is a species of click beetles in the subfamily Dendrometrinae. It is found in Brazil.

References

External links 
 Cardiorhinus at Biolib
 
 Cardiorhinus elegans at the Interim Register of Marine and Nonmarine Genera

Elaterinae
Beetles of South America
Insects of Brazil
Beetles described in 1983